Knocker and knockers may refer to:

Knocker (folklore), mythical creature in Welsh and Cornish folklore
Knocker (radio series)

People:
Elsie Knocker (1884–1978), British nurse and ambulance driver in World War I who won numerous medals for bravery
Knocker Norton or Steve Norton, English rugby league footballer
nickname of Enoch West (1886–1965), English footballer

Items that knock:
Door knocker, item of door furniture that allows people outside to alert those inside
Knocker-up, profession in England and Ireland before alarm clocks were affordable or reliable
Port knocker, to externally open ports on a firewall
Sanctuary Knocker, ornamental knocker on the door of a cathedral

Other knockers:
Popper knockers or Clackers, a toy popular around 1970
Saggarmaker's bottom knocker, manufacturer of saggars (boxlike containers used in firing pottery) in the UK
Staple knocker, tool resembling a screwdriver for removing staples and shredded material
Swish knocker or Swish cymbal
Breasts (colloq.)

See also
Knacker
Knokke
Knucker

de:Knockers
fr:Knocker
nl:Knocker